Egerniinae is the subfamily of social skinks within the family Scincidae. The genera in this subfamily were previously found to belong the Egernia group in the large subfamily Lygosominae.

Genera

The subfamily Egerniinae contains 63 species in 8 genera.

References

External links